Joseph Horatio Wickham (1911-2000) was a prominent Brevard County, Florida politician serving on the County Commission from 1952 to 1964 and from 1972 to 1984. Wickham's most notable achievements were securing rights of way for many of the county's current roadways, and establishing a permanent mosquito control program.  One of these roads is Wickham Road.

Early life
Originally from Iowa, Wickham arrived in Brevard County in 1926 at the age of 14. He attended Eau Gallie High School on Pineapple Avenue, graduating in 1928. He learned local geography working as a soft drink delivery driver. Later, he received training as a surveyor from his father, John Quincy Wickham. Surveys were made primarily of county wilderness during the early 1930s, a time when only a few dirt roads existed. During the thirties, Wickham served as Eau Gallie’s fire chief.

During World War II, Wickham served with the United States Navy's Seabees, supervising runway and airport construction in the South Pacific. This wartime experience enabled him to start a small construction business in the late 1940s.

County commissioner
In 1952 Commissioner Max Rodes encouraged Wickham to run for the District 5 commission seat as a Democrat.

Soon after taking office, the former Seabee began to tackle the county's mosquito control problem. Wickham was instrumental in procuring the county's first dredge, marking the beginning of permanent mosquito control. Attempting to break up the age-old political method of funding sweetheart projects throughout the county, Wickham pushed the idea of special municipal taxing districts. This would allow local taxpayers to receive equipment and services directly proportional to the taxes collected in their particular district. After the plan was enacted, Wickham's growing district received the county's first and only mosquito control dredge. The equipment was assembled and launched along the Eau Gallie causeway in November 1953. This was the beginning of permanent mosquito control in a region once referred to as Mosquito County on 19th century maps.

Personal
He was married to Bernice Wickham.

Wickham joined the Bahia Shriners in 1954 and served as Potentate in 1968.

Footnotes

1911 births
2000 deaths
County commissioners in Florida
Florida Democrats
People from Eau Gallie, Florida
People from Iowa
20th-century American politicians